Ocydromia is a genus of hybotid flies.

Species
O. amazonica Rafael, 1991
O. glabricula (Fallén, 1816)
O. hirsutipes Becker, 1914
O. longicornis (Frey, 1953)
O. melanopleura Loew, 1840
O. melanopleura Loew, 1840
O. stigmatica Frey, 1953
O. tenuis Smith, 1969
O. unifasciata (Brunetti, 1913)
O. xiaowutaiensis Yang & Gaimari, 2005

References

Hybotidae
Empidoidea genera
Asilomorph flies of Europe
Taxa named by Johann Wilhelm Meigen